Gastrotheca monticola is a species of frog in the family Hemiphractidae. It is endemic to Peru; records from Ecuador probably refer to other species. Gastrotheca lojana was formerly considered a subspecies of this species, but is now treated as a full species.

The female carries the eggs in pouch on her back and deposits the tadpoles in a stream.

It is a common species in northern Peru. It can be locally threatened by habitat loss.

References

monticola
Amphibians of the Andes
Amphibians of Peru
Endemic fauna of Peru
Taxa named by Thomas Barbour
Taxa named by Gladwyn Kingsley Noble
Amphibians described in 1920
Taxonomy articles created by Polbot